The Institute for Employment Studies (IES) is a British centre of research and consultancy on human resources and employment. Its research is frequently cited in the mainstream national media.

The Institute's aim is to "help bring about sustainable improvements in employment policy and human resource management."

Its headquarters is located in Brighton, United Kingdom. The Institute also has a satellite office in the Westminster area of Central London.

History
IES was established in 1969 on the campus of Sussex University, as the Institute of Manpower Studies. It was initially led by Sir Peter Allen, then Deputy Chairman of ICI, and Willis Jackson, Baron Jackson of Burnley.

In 1994 it was renamed to its current title. In 2009 it relocated to central Brighton.

Key people
Its current Chair of its Board is David Smith. Other notable members of its Board include John Greatrex from Unipart, Nicola Smith from the Trades Union Congress and Professor David Guest of King's College London.

Previous office-holders include Stephen Haddrill (2007–2011) and Sheila Forbes.

Other notable former Council members include Brendan Barber.

 the Director of the Institute is Tony Wilson, who succeeded Nigel Meager.

References

External links

1969 establishments in England
Educational institutions established in 1969
Charities based in East Sussex
Human resource management consulting firms